Maher Ghanmi is a Tunisian freestyle wrestler. He is a bronze medalist at the African Games and a five-time medalist at the African Wrestling Championships.

He represented Tunisia at the 2019 African Games held in Rabat, Morocco and he won one of the bronze medals in the men's freestyle 74 kg event.

In 2021, he competed at the African & Oceania Olympic Qualification Tournament hoping to qualify for the 2020 Summer Olympics in Tokyo, Japan. He did not qualify at this tournament and he also failed to qualify for the Olympics at the World Olympic Qualification Tournament held in Sofia, Bulgaria.

References

External links 
 

Living people
Year of birth missing (living people)
Place of birth missing (living people)
Tunisian male sport wrestlers
Wrestlers at the 2010 Summer Youth Olympics
African Wrestling Championships medalists
African Games bronze medalists for Tunisia
African Games medalists in wrestling
Competitors at the 2019 African Games
21st-century Tunisian people